An ansible is a category of fictional devices or technology capable of near-instantaneous or faster-than-light communication. It can send and receive messages to and from a corresponding device over any distance or obstacle whatsoever with no delay, even between star systems. As a name for such a device, the word "ansible" first appeared in a 1966 novel by Ursula K. Le Guin. Since that time, the term has been broadly used in the works of numerous science fiction authors, across a variety of settings and continuities. A related term is ultrawave.

Coinage by Ursula Le Guin 
Ursula K. Le Guin coined the word "ansible" in her 1966 novel Rocannon's World. The word was a contraction of "answerable", as the device would allow its users to receive answers to their messages in a reasonable amount of time, even over interstellar distances.

The ansible was the basis for creating a specific kind of interstellar civilizationone where communications between far-flung stars are instantaneous, but humans can only travel at relativistic speeds. Under these conditions, a full-fledged galactic empire is not possible, but there is a looser interstellar organization, in which several of Le Guin's protagonists are involved.

Although Le Guin invented the name "ansible" for this type of device, fleshed out with specific details in her fictional works, the broader concept of instantaneous or faster-than-light communication had previously existed in science fiction. For example, similar communication functions were included in a device called an interocitor in the 1952 novel This Island Earth by Raymond F. Jones, and the 1955 film based on that novel, and in the "Dirac Communicator", which first appeared in James Blish's short story "Beep" (1954), which was later expanded into the novel The Quincunx of Time (1973). Robert A. Heinlein in Time for the Stars (1958) employed instantaneous telepathic communication between identical twin pairs over interstellar distances, and like Le Guin, provided a technical explanation based on a non-Einsteinian principle of simultaneity.

In Le Guin's works 
In her subsequent works, Le Guin continued to develop the concept of the ansible:

 In The Left Hand of Darkness (1969), Le Guin writes that the ansible "doesn't involve radio waves, or any form of energy. The principle it works on, the constant of simultaneity, is analogous in some ways to gravity ... One point has to be fixed, on a planet of certain mass, but the other end is portable."
 In The Word for World Is Forest (1972), Le Guin explains that in order for communication to work with any pair of ansibles, at least one "must be on a large-mass body, the other can be anywhere in the cosmos".
 In The Dispossessed (1974), Le Guin tells of the development of the theory leading up to the ansible.

Any ansible may be used to communicate through any other, by setting its coordinates to those of the receiving ansible. They have a limited bandwidth, which only allows for at most a few hundred characters of text to be communicated in any transaction of a dialog session, and are attached to a keyboard and small display to perform text messaging.

Use by later authors 
Since Le Guin's conception of the ansible, the name of the device has been borrowed by numerous authors. While Le Guin's ansible was said to communicate "instantaneously", the name has also been adopted for devices capable of communication at finite speeds that are faster than light.

Orson Scott Card's works 
Orson Scott Card, in his 1977 novelette and 1985 novel Ender's Game and its sequels, used the term "ansible" as an unofficial name for the philotic parallax instantaneous communicator, a machine capable of communicating across infinite distances with no time delay. In Ender's Game, a character states that "somebody dredged the name ansible out of an old book somewhere".

In the universe of the Ender's Game series, the ansible's functions involved a fictional subatomic particle, the philote. The two quarks inside a pi meson can be separated by an arbitrary distance, while remaining connected by "philotic rays". This concept is similar to quantum teleportation due to entanglement; however, in reality, quark confinement prevents quarks from being separated by any observable distance.

Card's version of the ansible was also featured in the video game Advent Rising, for which Card helped write the story, and in the movie Ender's Game, which was based on the book.

Other writers 

Numerous other writers have included faster-than-light communication devices in their fictional works. Notable examples include:
 Christopher Rowley, in his 1986 novel Starhammer, describes the Deep Link, an instantaneous interstellar communicator. Most commonly used for messaging, it is capable of voice and video conversations as well, although the latter only at great expense.
 Vernor Vinge, in the 1988 short story "The Blabber"
 Elizabeth Moon, in the 1995 novel Winning Colors
 Jason Jones, in the 1995 computer game Marathon 2: Durandal
 L.A. Graf, in the 1996 Star Trek: Deep Space Nine novel Time's Enemy
 Philip Pullman, in the 2000 novel The Amber Spyglass, part of the His Dark Materials trilogy.
 Neal Asher, in his Polity series of novels including Gridlinked (2001), in which the runcible, named in homage to the ansible, is an interstellar wormhole generator/teleporter
 Dan Simmons, in the 2003 novel Ilium
 Liu Cixin, in the 2008 trilogy Remembrance of Earth's Past
 Kim Stanley Robinson, in the 2012 novel 2312
 Becky Chambers, in the 2014 novel The Long Way to a Small, Angry Planet
 Neon Yang, in the 2017 novella Waiting on a Bright Moon
 Joe M. McDermott, in the 2017 novel The Fortress at the End of Time
 Thomas Happ, in the 2021 console and PC video game Axiom Verge 2

See also

 Faster-than-light communication
 Interstellar communication
 No-cloning theorem
 Quantum entanglement
 Tachyon
 Tachyonic antitelephone

References

Further reading 

 

Faster-than-light communication
Fictional technology